Gioacchino Pizzoli (Bologna, 1651- 1733) was an Italian painter, active as a history and figure painter during the Baroque period.

Biography
He was trained in Bologna, and married the painter Maria Oriana Galli da Bibbiena (1656–1749), daughter of Giovanni Maria of the Galli da Bibiena family. Their son, Domenico Pizzoli (1687-1720) was also a painter. A daughter joined a monastery in Reggio-Emilia.

In 1675-1677 along with his master, the quadratura painter Angelo Michele Colonna, the Sala del Consiglio Comunale (once Gallery of the Senate) of the Palazzo D'Accursio. He also helped fresco the Oratory of Santa Maria del Borgo in Bologna. Also in 1700, in Bologna, Pizzoli frescoed the then Collegio Ungaro-Illirici (now Collegio Venturoli) with frescoes on the History of Croatia and Hungary.

References

1651 births
1733 deaths
17th-century Italian painters
Italian male painters
18th-century Italian painters
Painters from Bologna
Italian Baroque painters
18th-century Italian male artists